Copelatus sumbawensis is a species of diving beetle. It is part of the subfamily Copelatinae in the family Dytiscidae. It was described by Régimbart in 1899.

References

sumbawensis
Beetles described in 1899